Priscilla Ng Che Ning, is a former English-speaking television journalist in Hong Kong. She worked at TVB News and served as an anchor and reporter.

She was the first batch of Bachelor of Journalism graduates at The University of Hong Kong in 2007. She had been a reporter of Star News Asia since 2005, but the program was suspended in early 2008. Afterward, she joined TVB News in 2008.

She was the host of "Hong Kong Review 2009". She was the newscaster of several news programs on TVB Pearl, namely News At Seven-Thirty, News headlines, Marketplace, World Market Update and News roundup. At times, she anchored the Weather Report.

She resigned and left TVB on February 14, 2012.

References

External links
Alumni Stories: The Success Stories of 12 JMSC Graduates Journalism and Media Studies Centre - The University of Hong Kong

TVB
Alumni of the University of Hong Kong
Hong Kong journalists
Hong Kong women journalists
Hong Kong television presenters
Hong Kong women television presenters
Living people
Year of birth missing (living people)